Moduza procris, the commander, sometimes included in the genus Limenitis, is a medium-sized, strikingly coloured brush-footed butterfly found in South Asia and Southeast Asia. It is notable for the mode of concealment employed by its caterpillar and the cryptic camouflage of its pupa.

Description
The upperside of its wings are a bright reddish brown. Towards the centre of the wing are broad white spots. In flight, one can see a bright red brown butterfly with a white band forming a V shape. There are also a few white spots scattered on the wings. Its hindwings have crenulated margins. The undersides of the wings are a whitish grey toward the base and have a row of dull reddish brown and a row of black spots along the margins. The male and female are similar in appearance.

Range
Subspecies:

M. p. procris Central India, Sikkim to South China, Thailand, South Myanmar, Cambodia, Indo-China
M. p. calidosa (Moore, 1858) Ceylon
M. p. anarta (Moore, 1877) Andaman Islands
M. p. arnoldi (Fruhstorfer, 1898) Bawean, Kangean Islands
M. p. undifragus (Fruhstorfer, 1906) South India
M. p. milonia (Fruhstorfer, 1906) Peninsular Malaya, Thailand
M. p. minoe (Fruhstorfer, 1906) Sumatra
M. p. batuna (Fruhstorfer, 1906) Batu Islands
M. p. aemonia (Weymer, 1883) Nias
M. p. agnata (Fruhstorfer, 1897) Borneo
M. p. neutra (Fruhstorfer, 1897) Java, Bali, Lombok
M. p. laubenheimeri (Hagen, 1898) Mentawai Islands
M. p. sumbawana (Fruhstorfer, 1913) Sumbawa
M. p. sumbana (Fruhstorfer, 1913) Sumba
M. p. floresiana (Fruhstorfer, 1906) Flores
M. p. bankana (Fruhstorfer, 1913) Bangka Island
M. p. florensis (Fruhstorfer, 1913) Flores
M. p. tioma Eliot, 1978 Pulau Tioman

Range within India
Sri Lanka, Peninsular India, the Himalayas east of the Dun valley, through Kumaon, Nepal, Sikkim to Assam, Arunachal, and onto Myanmar. Locally abundant, it is common from Sri Lanka to Maharashtra. It is rare in Gujarat and far more common in the Himalayas.

Ecology

The commander is generally found in forested regions having moderate to heavy rainfall. It usually keeps to low elevations, that is, up to  into the hills.

It is fond of open glades, roadsides and clearings in forests. It is abundant along watercourses in dry and moist deciduous forests. It is also found close to villages or wherever its larval host plant Mussaenda frondosa is found. It is most common in the post-monsoon months and winter.

The commander can often be spotted basking with its wings pressed flat on exposed stones in streambeds. Individuals settle down on an exposed perch high up in the trees during the heat of the day. At this time it can be seen defending its territory and driving intruding butterflies away.

This butterfly has a swift flight with rapid wingbeats and alternate spurts of smooth gliding. A powerful flier, it nevertheless flies for short distances at a time. Being wary, it maintains its distance and is best caught when engrossed in mud-puddling or feeding from flowers. It regularly visits flowers from low-lying herbs to high up in the trees. Though this is a mud-puddling species, in Borneo and probably elsewhere, adults do not visit carrion or old fruit to drink liquids.

Host plants
Most of the larval host plants belong to the family Rubiaceae.

 Cadaba fruticosa
 Grewia nervosa
 Prunus dulcis
 Cinchona 
 Mitragyna parvifolia
 Mussaenda frondosa 
 Mussaenda philippica
 Neolamarckia cadamba
 Ochreinauclea missionis 
 Wendlandia 
 Wendlandia heynei
 Wendlandia thyrsoidea
 Hedyotis orixense

Life cycle

Egg
The female commander lays a single egg on the underside of the tip of a leaf of the food plant. The egg is hairy and greenish and looks like a green strawberry. The egg hatches in 3 to 4 days.

Caterpillar
The caterpillar is dirty brown with a chestnut tinge and dark brown splotches all over. The body also bears numerous processes which help to break up its outline. The behaviour of this caterpillar is very interesting in that it is one of the species of butterfly that makes long chains of frass. It eats up part of the leaf it is on and uses bits of leaves which are strung up with silk along with droppings. The caterpillar rests on the exposed mid-rib of a leaf after removing the leafy portions on the sides. This behaviour may be to dissuade ants from crossing over the chain of frass behind which the caterpillar rests.

Pupa
Before pupating, the caterpillar wanders around, often far away from the plant it fed on. It pupates among dried leaves and twigs. The pupa is brownish and rough in texture. It is angular with prominent wing expansions and bears flat processes on the head which curl together making a hole between them. It also has numerous lines and markings that make it look like a rolled up dried leaf.

Footnotes

References
 
 
 
 Hamer, K.C.; Hill, J.K.; Benedick, S.; Mustaffa, N.; Chey, V.K. & Maryati, M. (2006): Diversity and ecology of carrion- and fruit-feeding butterflies in Bornean rain forest. Journal of Tropical Ecology 22: 25–33.  (HTML abstract)
 
 Robinson, Gaden, S.; Ackery, Phillip R.; Kitching, Ian J.; Beccaloni, George W. & Hernández, Luis M. (2007): HOSTS - a Database of the World's Lepidopteran Hostplants. Accessed July 2007.

External links

 
 ASEAN biodiversity database

Limenitidinae
Butterflies of Asia
Butterflies of Singapore
Butterflies of Borneo
Taxa named by Pieter Cramer
Butterflies described in 1777